, from the Ainu onne (ancient) and to (lake), is a freshwater lake near Ashoro in Akan National Park, Hokkaidō, Japan.

See also
Onnetō Hot Falls

References

Onneto
Akan National Park